David Griffin (born 19 July 1943) is an English actor best known for both his roles as Squadron Leader Clive Dempster DFC in Hi-de-Hi! between 1984 and 1988 and Emmet Hawksworth in Keeping Up Appearances between 1991 and 1995.

Career
His first screen role was in 1960 in the film A French Mistress, and roles like Ricketts in The Fifth Form at St. Dominic's in 1961, David Ashton in Outbreak of Murder in 1962 and Mark Dennison in Quick Before They Catch Us in 1966 followed soon after and became both popular and familiar with viewers. Griffin would appear in the smash hit film Battle of Britain in 1969 as Sergeant Pilot Chris and in popular television series including Dixon of Dock Green in 1968 and then again in 1974, Z-Cars in 1970.

Other television appearances include a guest role in an episode of Doctor Who ("The Sea Devils"), 'Allo 'Allo!, Dixon of Dock Green, Emmerdale Farm and two episodes of Ripping Yarns. After finishing Keeping Up Appearances in 1995, he toured worldwide, with Su Pollard, in the stage show The Good Sex Guide. He has also starred in several pantomimes such as Jack and the Beanstalk amongst others. In 2004, Griffin appeared on the Keeping Up Appearances episode of Comedy Connections, discussing his role of Emmet in Keeping Up Appearances.

Filmography

References

External links

David Griffin at the British Film Institute
David Griffin (Aveleyman)

1943 births
Living people
20th-century English male actors
21st-century English male actors
English male stage actors
English male television actors
Male actors from London
People from Richmond, London